Felix A. Chami is an archaeologist from Tanzania. He is a professor at the University of Dar es Salaam, focusing on East African coastal archaeology. Dr. Chami discovered, on the island of Mafia and Juani, artifacts that revealed East Africa as being integral to the Indian Ocean trade. Chami earned a first degree in sociology from the University of Dar es Salaam in 1986, a master's degree in anthropology from Brown University in 1988 and a Ph.D. in archaeology from Uppsala University in 1994.

References

Living people
Year of birth missing (living people)
Academic staff of the University of Dar es Salaam
Tanzanian archaeologists
University of Dar es Salaam alumni
Brown University alumni
Uppsala University alumni